The 1819 Indiana gubernatorial election took place August 2, 1819, under the provisions of the Constitution of Indiana. It was the second gubernatorial election in the State of Indiana. Jonathan Jennings, the incumbent governor, was reelected with 81.5% of the vote to 17.8% for his nearest competitor, Lieutenant Governor Christopher Harrison. The election was held concurrently with elections for lieutenant governor and members of the Indiana General Assembly.

Jennings had been elected governor in 1816 following ratification of the state's first constitution. His administration pursued policies to promote internal improvements and the development of a state banking system, creation of a state university, and adoption of a personal liberty law to protect free people of color living in Indiana. In 1818 he became embroiled in a controversy surrounding his acceptance of a federal commission to negotiate the Treaty of St. Mary's. The Indiana constitution specified that no person "holding any office under the United States ... shall exercise the office of governor." Jennings' political enemies interpreted this to mean he had vacated the governorship by accepting the federal commission. Harrison accepted this interpretation, and declaring himself the rightful governor, appealed to the General Assembly for support. The legislature, however, declined to pursue impeachment proceedings against Jennings, and Jennings forcefully denied that he had relinquished his position as governor. In the general election, Jennings handily defeated Harrison and two other challengers.

At the time of the election, the Democratic-Republican Party was dominant nationally and politics in the new state operated on a nonpartisan basis. The geographic factionalism of the territorial period had mostly dissipated. Campaigns were conducted through the circulation of handbills and other print materials and public appearances at militia musters, log rollings, and other community events. As it was considered untoward to advocate directly for one's own election, candidates usually disguised their visits with voters as being personal in nature, claiming private business had brought them to the vicinity en route to some other destination.

Results

Results by county
The official returns appear to have been lost. Unofficial results published in various newspapers in the weeks following the election include figures from most, but not all, counties. Significantly, the sum of the votes for Harrison in the surviving unofficial results is greater than the total recorded in the journal of the Indiana House of Representatives by a factor of 970 votes. The returns from Crawford and Lawrence were rejected by the General Assembly on technical grounds.

The surviving results, as compiled in A New Nation Votes, are as follows.

Notes

References

Bibliography

Political history of Indiana
1816